Pławno may refer to the following villages in Poland:
Pławno, Łódź Voivodeship (central Poland)
Pławno, Greater Poland Voivodeship (west-central Poland)
Pławno, Choszczno County in West Pomeranian Voivodeship (north-west Poland)